Ueno Tameike Dam is a rockfill dam located in Shimane Prefecture in Japan. The dam is used for irrigation. The catchment area of the dam is 0.5 km2. The dam impounds about 3  ha of land when full and can store 102 thousand cubic meters of water. The construction of the dam was completed in 1964.

References

Dams in Shimane Prefecture
1964 establishments in Japan